A list of highest peaks in the Canadian Rockies is shown below:

References

Notes

•
Canadian Rockies
Mountains, Rockies
Mountains, Rockies